Uncial 0204 (in the Gregory-Aland numbering), is a Greek-Coptic diglot uncial manuscript of the New Testament, dated paleographically to the 7th century.

Description 

The codex contains a small parts of the Gospel of Matthew 24:39-42,44-48 (Coptic 24:30-33,35-37), on one parchment leaf (25 cm by 21 cm). It is written in two columns per page, 26 lines per page, in very large uncial letters. The Coptic part is written in Fayumic dialect.

The Greek text of this codex is a representative of the Alexandrian text-type. Aland placed it in Category II.

Currently it is dated by the INTF to the 7th century.

The Coptic text was examined by Walter Ewing Crum in 1905 (as P. Lond. Copt. 500). 
The manuscript was added to the list of the New Testament manuscripts by Ernst von Dobschütz in 1933.

The codex currently is housed at the British Library (Gr. 4923 (2)) in London.

See also 

 List of New Testament uncials
 Coptic versions of the Bible
 Textual criticism

References

Further reading 

 Anna Passoni dell'Acqua, Aegyptus 60 (1980), pp. 110-119. 

Greek New Testament uncials
7th-century biblical manuscripts 
Greek-Coptic diglot manuscripts of the New Testament
British Library collections